X10 may refer to:

 North American X-10, an unmanned technology demonstrator for advanced missile technologies
 SL X10, a Swedish suburban train
 X10 industry standard, communication over wired power line or wireless used for home automation
 X10 Wireless Technology, a vendor of home automation products
 X-10, a code name for the Metallurgical Project
 X-10 Graphite Reactor, one of the world's first nuclear reactors
 Sony Ericsson Xperia X10, a smartphone using the Android operating system
 X10 (video game), a video game by Warthog Games Limited
 X Ten, a gene-sequencing machine in the HiSeq series produced by the San Diego-based biotech firm Illumina
 Fujifilm X10, a digital compact camera from 2011

Computer related

 X10 programming language
 Microsoft X10 Event, a Microsoft conference demonstrating Xbox 360 games/technologies for 2010 on 11 February 2010
 X Window System, 10th protocol version from 1986 to 1988